S.S. Charles L. Wheeler Jr. was a 3,300 ton cargo ship, ordered by the United States Shipping Board as the Point Judith and delivered in July 1918 by the Albina Engine and Machine Works of Portland, Oregon. Renamed SS Charles L. Wheeler Jr. in 1929, the ship was scrapped in 1948.

Career

On 17 December 1933, Charles L. Wheeler Jr. ran aground on Sand Island in Oregon′s Columbia River. She was refloated on 30 December 1933.

In 1938, the world′s largest single-lift lock was opened at the Bonneville Dam on the Columbia River. As part of the opening ceremonies of the lock, Captain Arthur Riggs, a veteran upper Columbia river pilot, took Charles L. Wheeler Jr. – which was operated by McCormick Steamship Company and loaded with sugar, building materials, beer, hardware, automobiles, and general freight – upstream from Portland, transited the Bonneville Locks and continued on to the historic upper river steamboat port of  The Dalles, Oregon. She was the first ship to transit the lock at Bonneville Dam and the first ocean-going merchant ship to transit the Columbia River all the way to The Dalles, located 200 miles (322 km) upstream from the Pacific Ocean. Once unloaded at the Port of the Dalles, the ship was then loaded with lumber, wheat, flour, and other local products for the return voyage. Residents of The Dalles had hoped the trip would bring increased business to their port, but the trip was a one-time event, and the Columbia River is dominated by barge traffic.

In 1941 the purse seiner Lina B., fishing out of San Francisco, California, and Charles L. Wheeler Jr. collided in fog in the Pacific Ocean near the Farallon Islands off the coast of California, ripping a hole in the bow of Lina B. and disabled her steering gear.

References

Merchant ships of the United States
Columbia River Gorge
Columbia River
History of Oregon
The Dalles, Oregon
History of Portland, Oregon
History of San Francisco
Ships of the United States Army
Ships built in Portland, Oregon
1918 ships
Maritime incidents in 1933
Maritime incidents in 1941